Joshua Arneas Bazell, born in 1970, is an American writer and medical doctor.

Bazell graduated from Brown University with a B.A. in English Literature. He has an M.D. from Columbia University and did his medical residency at the University of California, San Francisco.

Private life 
Bazell's father is Robert Bazell, chief science and health correspondent for NBC News. His mother is Ilene Tanz Gordon. His sister Rebecca Bazell is an illustrator and writer.

In August 1982, Josh Bazell, then 12 years of age, and his family were left adrift at sea in a 14-foot (4.3 metre) aluminum boat when it ran out of fuel 2 miles (3.2 kilometres) from Grand Cayman island. Josh's father swam to shore to summon help but on returning, the boat with Margot (the step-mother), Rebecca and Josh aboard, had drifted away and could not be found. The search involved many private vessels, four military aircraft and a Coast Guard cutter.  In the afternoon of the fourth day the Japanese tanker Arabia Addas happened upon the boat, which had drifted to a position 40 miles (64 km) from Grand Cayman. The family were re-united that night aboard the tanker. The family were afterwards described as "in absolutely perfect condition -  a bit skinny and suntanned".

Bibliography
Beat the Reaper (2009)
Wild Thing (2012)

Notes and references

External links

Washington Post article
Bloomberg.com
Variety.com
Guardian review

Living people
21st-century American novelists
Brown University alumni
Columbia University Vagelos College of Physicians and Surgeons alumni
1970 births
American male novelists
21st-century American male writers